Mário Jaime Raimundo Duarte, known as Marocas (born 17 February 1988) is a Portuguese football player who plays for Vilafranquense.

Club career
Born in Albufeira, Marocas passed through several amateur clubs in his native Algarve in his early career. In the 2013–14 Campeonato Nacional de Seniores he scored 23 goals for Sport Benfica e Castelo Branco, and added three more in other competitions. Halfway through the season, he and teammate Alvarinho trained with Zawisza Bydgoszcz of Poland, but only the latter made the move permanent.

Marocas then moved to Segunda Liga club C.D. Santa Clara, but was loaned back to Castelo Branco in September 2014 for the season. He made his one professional appearance for the Azorean team on 8 August 2015 in a 1–0 loss at Vitória S.C. B, playing the final 17 minutes in place of Paulo Clemente. Twenty days later, he terminated his contract by mutual consent with a year remaining.

After a season with U.D. Oliveirense, who were relegated from the second division, Marocas signed with U.D. Vilafranquense in the third tier in 2016. On 20 November that year, he scored the only goal of a home win against Primeira Liga club F.C. Paços de Ferreira in the fourth round of the Taça de Portugal.

On 7 June 2018, Marocas returned to his native region, signing a two-year deal with former club Louletano D.C. also in the third tier.

References

External links
Marocas at Soccerway

1988 births
People from Albufeira
Living people
Portuguese footballers
Louletano D.C. players
Imortal D.C. players
C.D. Fátima players
Sport Benfica e Castelo Branco players
C.D. Santa Clara players
Liga Portugal 2 players
Campeonato de Portugal (league) players
U.D. Oliveirense players
Association football forwards
Sportspeople from Faro District